Edwin Adams (February 3, 1834 – October 28, 1877) was an American stage actor, considered to have been one of America's best light comedians.

He was born in Medford, Massachusetts, and worked "at a mechanical trade in Boston" before he became an actor.

Adams began his career on the stage in The Hunchback, at the National Theatre in Boston in 1853. He also appeared in Hamlet with Kate Josephine Bateman in 1860, as well in The Serf in 1865, and The Dead Heart, Wild Oats, The Lady of Lyons, Narcisse, and The Marble Heart.

He was a member of the Actors' Order of Friendship (AOOF). A benevolent association started in 1849 with chapters in Philadelphia and New York City.

Although he apparently was not involved personally with the group, Adams allowed use of his name for the 1865 creation of the Adams's Dramatic Association in Pittsburgh.

In 1867, Adams joined Edwin Booth's acting company, appearing in Romeo and Juliet, Narcisse, Othello, and Enoch Arden, becoming the creator of the Arden role. From 1870 to 1875, Adams toured the country performing his best-known roles.

Adams toured Australia in 1876 and became ill while he was there. After he returned to the United States, he was the recipient of a benefit at the California Theatre in San Francisco.

His last appearance was at the California Theatre in San Francisco in 1876. His health failed on a visit to Australia, and he died in Philadelphia in 1877. He is buried in Mount Moriah Cemetery.

References

External links
American National Biography, vol. 1, pp. 83–84.
Who Was Who in America: Historical Volume, 1607-1896. Chicago: Marquis Who's Who, 1963.

1834 births
1877 deaths
Male actors from Massachusetts
People from Medford, Massachusetts
19th-century American male actors
American male stage actors
Burials at Mount Moriah Cemetery (Philadelphia)